Winchester Historic District may refer to:

Winchester Historic District (Winchester, Illinois)
Winchester Residential Historic District, Winchester, Indiana, listed on the National Register of Historic Places in Randolph County, Indiana
Winchester Historic District (Winchester, Virginia)